Portugal 1111: A Conquista de Soure ("Portugal 1111: The Conquest of Soure") is a real-time strategy game developed by Ciberbit, a Portuguese multimedia company, in partnership with the Municipality of Soure and historians from the University of Coimbra. The game depicts the historical events of the Portuguese Reconquista, when the Christians fought against Moorish invaders.

It was the first commercial video game completely produced and designed in Portugal.

The game, a historic real-time strategy game similar to Microsoft's Age of Empires, was published by the Portuguese magazine Visão and was released in 2004.

External links
Official website 
Portugal 1111: A Conquista de Soure at Ciberbit.pt
Review at PTGamers.com 
Review at Gamerstek.com 
Portugal 1111: A Conquista de Soure at GameSpot
Portugal 1111: A Conquista de Soure at MobyGames
Portugal 1111: A Conquista de Soure at GameFAQs
Screenshots at the Official website

References

2004 video games
Europe-exclusive video games
Video games set in the Middle Ages
Real-time strategy video games
Video games developed in Portugal
Video games set in Portugal
Video games with historical settings
Video games with isometric graphics
Windows games
Windows-only games